Jackson Alexander "Jack" Hardy (November 1, 1924 – August 22, 2006) was a politician in Manitoba, Canada.  He was the mayor of St. Vital, and served in the Legislative Assembly of Manitoba from 1969 to 1971 as a member of the Progressive Conservative Party.

Early life and career
The son of Dufferin A. Hardy and Martha Gracer, Hardy was born in Thunder Bay, Ontario.  He was a member of the Royal Canadian Air Force during World War II, and subsequently became an accountant at the Fort William Grain Elevator.  Transferred to Winnipeg in 1950, he settled in the suburban community of St. Vital.

Hardy married Catherine Mary Murray in 1945.

Politician
Hardy was a municipal councillor in St. Vital for four years, and spent a further five years as the community's mayor.  He was elected to the Manitoba legislature in the 1969 provincial election, defeating New Democratic Party candidate Jim Walding by only 23 votes in the St. Vital electoral division.  He continued to serve as mayor of St. Vital, and was re-elected to his municipal position in late 1969.  He opposed the amalgamation of St. Vital into the new "unicity" of Winnipeg.

Hardy's time in the legislature was brief.  He was absent from the province for much of 1970, and was hired as the assistant city manager for Terrance, British Columbia late in the year.  Some described his behaviour during this time as erratic.  He was quoted as saying, "I have to earn a living, and in Manitoba -- it is totally impossible for a politician to do it solely in politics."  He left Manitoba in December 1970, and formally resigned his seat in the legislature on February 16, 1971.  In the 1973 provincial election, he endorsed Liberal candidate Dan Kennedy.

Hardy retired to Vernon, British Columbia, and died at home there in 2006 after a short illness.

Electoral record

Provincial

Municipal

External links
Obituary (Winnipeg Free Press)

References

1924 births
2006 deaths
Mayors of places in Manitoba
Politicians from Thunder Bay
Progressive Conservative Party of Manitoba MLAs